This article lists events relating to rail transport that occurred during the 1790s.

1790

Events

Unknown date events
 The world's first railway viaduct, which became known as the "Covered Bridge", is built at Blaenavon in South Wales for a horse-worked tramway carrying coal to the ironworks coke ovens.

1791

Births

Unknown date births
 John Brandt, American steam locomotive builder (died c. 1860).

1792

Births

Unknown date births
 Thomas Rogers, founder of Rogers, Ketchum and Grosvenor (died 1856).

1793

Events

Unknown date events 
 The world's oldest surviving railway tunnel is constructed at Fritchley on the "Butterley Gangroad", the Butterley Company's plateway to carry limestone from Hilt's Quarry at Crich to kilns on the Cromford Canal at Bullbridge in Derbyshire, England, by Benjamin Outram.

Births

Unknown date births
 Holmes Hinkley, American steam locomotive manufacturer (died 1866).

1794

Births

May births
 May 27 – Cornelius Vanderbilt, American financier who created the New York Central and Hudson River Railroad from the merger of several smaller railroads in New York (d. 1877).

October births
 October 22 – Edward Bury, English steam locomotive builder (d. 1858).

December births
 December 14 – Erastus Corning, established railroads in New York and was instrumental in the formation of New York Central (d. 1872).

Unknown date births 
 Jasper Grosvenor, American financier who partnered with Thomas Rogers and Morris Ketchum to form Rogers, Ketchum and Grosvenor (d. 1857).

1795

Events

Unknown date events 
 A wooden railway on Beacon Hill in Boston carried excavations down the hill to clear the land for the State House

Births

December births
 December 10 – Matthias W. Baldwin, American steam locomotive manufacturer (d. 1866).

Unknown date births
 John B. Jervis, Chief mechanical engineer of the Mohawk and Hudson Railroad who pioneered the use of the leading truck on steam locomotives (d. 1885).

1796

Births

February births
 February – Morris Ketchum, partner in Rogers, Ketchum and Grosvenor, director of Illinois Central Railroad (d. 1880)

April births
 April 19 – Franz Anton von Gerstner, Bohemian-born railway civil engineer (d. 1840)

1797

Births

July
 July 29 – Daniel Drew, board member and financier of the Erie Railroad (d. 1879).

Unknown date
 Asa Whitney, one of the first backers of an American Transcontinental Railway.

1798

Events
 The Lake Lock Rail Road near Wakefield opens.
 First known use of cast-iron chaired 'fish-belly' edge-rails, at Walker Colliery near Newcastle upon Tyne in the north-east of England.

1799

Events

April events
 April 15 – The Earl of Carlisle's waggonway opens from coal pits owned by George Howard, 6th Earl of Carlisle around Lambley to Brampton, Cumbria, England.

Births

January births
 January 23 – Alois Negrelli, builder of the first railway in Switzerland, connecting Zurich and Baden (d. 1858).

February births
 February 28 – William Dargan, Irish railway contractor (d. 1867).

May births
 May – George Hennet, English railway contractor (d. 1857).

June births
 June 22 – Joseph Pease, English railway promoter (d. 1872).

See also
Years in rail transport

References